The Lion Man: African Safari is a South African television documentary series based at Jabula Big Cat Sanctuary near Rustenburg, South Africa. It is presented and narrated by "The Lion Man" Craig Busch.

Two series were produced, the first of which was produced in 2013 with filming taking place in South Africa, New Zealand and England. Series two was filmed entirely in South Africa.

Episodes

Series One

Animals
These animals featured in the television show and currently reside at Jabula Big Cat Sanctuary.

Jabula - White Lion
Shia Jnr - Barbary Lion
Zantein - Barbary Lion
Thembi - White Lion
Saloni - Bengal Tiger
Shika - Bengal Tiger
Sevati - White Bengal Tiger
Zeus - Cheetah
Zara - Cheetah
Zenda - Giraffe
Tshaka - Barbary Lion
Thambile - Barbary Lion
Siramba - Barbary Lion
S'bu - Barbary Lion
Zamani - Barbary Lion

References

External links 
 The Lion Man page at the Discovery World website
 The Lion Man's Twitter account
 Jabula Big Cat Sanctuary website
 Jabula Big Cat Sanctuary's Twitter account

Television series about lions